Coque or Coques can refer to:

People
 Gonzales Coques, a Flemish baroque painter.
 Coque Malla, a Spanish musician and actor. 
 Oliver De Coque, a musician
 Inofre Coque the first British governor of Mumbai during the British Raj.

Places
 Grosses Coques, Nova Scotia, community located in Digby County, Nova Scotia.
 d'Coque National Sports and Culture Centre in Kirchberg, Luxembourg City, Luxembourg.

Things
 The plural of Coca (pastry). (See also Valencian cuisine and Catalan cuisine)
 A shell as in the monocoque design of modern aircraft and cars.